Lieutenant General Edward Grant Martin Davis,  (born 13 February 1963) is a former senior Royal Marines officer. He was Commandant General Royal Marines from December 2011 to June 2014, and the Deputy Commander of NATO's Allied Land Command in Izmir, Turkey, from 2014 to 2015. He was Governor of Gibraltar from 2016 to 2020.

Early life
Davis was born in Hereford, Herefordshire. He was educated at Coleraine Academical Institution, County Londonderry, Northern Ireland and King's College London (MA Defence Studies, 1998).

Military career
Davis was commissioned into the Royal Marines in 1981 and joined 40 Commando with whom he undertook a six-month tour in the Falkland Islands and then a six-month tour in Cyprus. In 1996, he attended the Army Command and Staff Course at Staff College, Camberley. In the same year, he became Chief of Staff at the Headquarters of the Combat Service Support Group (UK) in which role he took part in the Bosnian War. He was appointed Chief of Staff to the Commander of the UK's Amphibious Forces in 2007 and was deployed to Afghanistan as Chief of Joint Effects for ISAF. He was appointed Commander of 3 Commando Brigade in January 2010 and again deployed to Afghanistan – this time as the Commander of Task Force Helmand. He became Commandant General Royal Marines in December 2011.

Davis was promoted to major general on 10 January 2012, with seniority from 28 November 2011. Davis succeeded Lieutenant General Gordon Messenger as Deputy Commander of NATO Allied Land Command (LANDCOM)-Izmir in July 2014.

Civilian career
On 1 October 2015, the British Foreign and Commonwealth Office announced that Davis was the designated Governor of Gibraltar after the resignation of Sir James Dutton.

Honours and awards
14 June 1996 – Appointed a Member of the Order of the British Empire (MBE)
31 December 2005 – Advanced to an Officer of the Order of the British Empire (OBE) in the 2006 New Year Honours
23 March 2012 – Advanced to a Commander of the Order of the British Empire (CBE) "in recognition of gallant and distinguished services in Afghanistan during the period 1 April 2011 to 30 September 2011".
14 June 2014 – Appointed a Companion of the Order of the Bath (CB) in the 2014 Birthday Honours.
5 August 2016 – Appointed a Knight of the Order of St John by Queen Elizabeth II.

References

External links

 RM Biography

|-

 

1963 births
Graduates of the Staff College, Camberley
Living people
Governors of Gibraltar
People educated at Coleraine Academical Institution
Alumni of King's College London
Royal Marines generals
Commanders of the Order of the British Empire
Royal Navy personnel of the War in Afghanistan (2001–2021)
Officers of the Legion of Merit
Companions of the Order of the Bath
21st-century Royal Marines personnel
People from Hereford
Military personnel from Herefordshire